Frederik Løchte Nielsen (born 27 August 1983) is a former professional tennis player. He was the top ranked player from Denmark in the ATP doubles world rankings. A former Wimbledon men's doubles champion, he peaked at no. 17 in the rankings in April 2013. Nielsen has reached five other doubles finals on tour, winning on two occasions.

Nielsen's parents were both tennis players and he picked up the sport at the age of three. Having turned professional in 2001, he began competing on the ITF circuit, winning a singles title every year between 2005 and 2010. He continued to play in ITF and ATP Challenger tournaments, garnering considerable success on the doubles circuit where he won multiple titles during the period.
 
Nielsen made a transition on to the main ATP Tour beginning 2012. He represented Denmark at the Hopman Cup that year, playing a few keenly contested matches against top-ranked opponents including Tomas Berdych and Mardy Fish, while also winning in doubles with Caroline Wozniacki. Nielsen entered the 2012 Wimbledon Championships with Jonathan Marray as wildcard entrant, but the duo went on to win the tournament upstaging such higher-ranked opponents as the Bryan brothers en route to the title. He became only the second Danish player to ever win a Grand Slam title (following his grandfather Kurt) and the first wildcard entrant to win Wimbledon men's doubles title.

Partnering Johan Brunström, Nielsen reached the finals of the 2012 Moselle Open and the 2013 Heineken Open, before winning his first tour-level title at the 2014 Aircel Chennai Open. He continued to play on the Challenger tour in singles, while enjoying success in doubles on the main ATP circuit, winning again at the 2019 BMW Open. He is currently coached by former Danish Davis Cup player Patrik Langvardt.

Nielsen is the grandson of Kurt Nielsen. A former Danish tennis player and two-time Wimbledon finalist a US Open Mixed Doubles champion.

Career

Debut and early years
Nielsen made his ATP singles debut in Copenhagen, losing to Magnus Larsson in the first round d 6–1, 6–1. In 2003, he made his Davis Cup debut in the Europe/Africa Zone Group II tie against Tunisia at Hillerod, Denmark and defeated Malek Jaziri 6–1, 6–4 in the dead rubber, Denmark winning 4–1. Nielsen also won the singles title at the Futures event in Vietnam.

In 2004, Nielsen teamed with countryman Rasmus Nørby to win 5 Futures doubles titles. Reached 1 Futures Singles final. He won 1 doubles Futures title and 2 titles in 4 Futures singles finals in 2005. In 2006, he won doubles title at 2 Challengers and 7 Futures. Also won 3 Futures singles titles.

In 2007, Nielsen won doubles titles at 3 Challengers and Futures. 2-time singles winner at Futures. In 2008, Nielsen won 2 doubles Challengers and 1 Futures, all three with different partners. In 2009, he won 3 Challengers tournaments in doubles and 1 Futures title in singles.

In 2010, Nielsen won 2 Challengers and 3 Futures in Men's doubles. He also won singles Futures event in Italy. The following year, he won 5 Challengers doubles titles with 3 different partners; he was the finalist at 3 other events.

2012: Wimbledon doubles champion

Nielsen represented Denmark at the 2012 Hopman Cup alongside Caroline Wozniacki, but the pair could not get past the Group Stages. Nielsen had a 1–4 Win–loss record at the event, 1–1 in doubles and 0–3 in singles. He played much higher ranked opponents in Tomáš Berdych, Grigor Dimitrov and Mardy Fish. He managed to win 1 set against Fish but eventually lost 4–6, 7–6, 6–4. Nielsen and Wozniacki still managed to pull out the doubles match against Fish and Bethanie Mattek-Sands 7–5, 6-3 and won their only tie against USA.

He then played at the Australian Open and qualified for the main draw at a Grand Slam for the first time but lost to Kevin Anderson 6–1, 6–2, 6–4 in the first round. In February, Nielsen was selected for the Davis Cup Europe/Africa Zone Group I tie against Slovenia, which Denmark lost 5–0.

Nielsen had been friends with Jonny Marray since their early days on the senior tour, but had only played together twice before in 2006 and 2008.

Playing doubles with Marray in June, their first pairing of the year, they reached the Nottingham Challenger finals, losing out to Treat Huey and Dominic Inglot in three tight sets 4–6, 7-6(9), 8-10. They compiled a 10-6 match record in 6 tournaments.

Then Nielsen and Marray received a wild card at the All England Club and began their 2012 Wimbledon Championships with a 5-set  win over Marcel Granollers and Marc Lopez, one of 4 teams they beat en route that qualified for Barclays ATP World Tour Finals. In the third-round, they edged out another five set victory this time against Aisam-Ul-Haq Qureshi and Jean-Julien Rojer 7–5 in 5th set, followed with victory over James Cerretani and Edouard Roger-Vasselin in the quarters in five sets again. In the Semi-Finals they caused the biggest upset by beating No. 2 seeds Bryans in 4 sets  6–4, 7-6(9), 6-7(4), 7-6(5). In the title clash they defeated the No. 5 seeds Robert Lindstedt and Horia Tecau in 5-sets  4–6, 6–4, 7-6(5), 6-7(5), 6–3. Marray was first British doubles champion at Wimbledon since 1936 and Nielsen was first Dane to win the doubles crown.

Following Wimbledon, they played together in 4 tournaments (2-4 record), losing first round in Winston-Salem, second round at Us Open losing to Jesse Levine and Marinko Matosevic having beaten the Italian duo of Flavio Cipolla and Fabio Fognini in the first round. They had a quarter-final in Basel losing out to Mariusz Fyrstenberg and Marcin Matkowski.

Nielsen and Marray made their debut at the Barclays ATP World Tour Finals in London, qualifying for the season finale as a result of their Wimbledon crown, and reached the Semi-Finals losing out to eventual champions Marcel Granollers and Marc Lopez 4–6, 3–6. In the Round-Robin stage the pair defeated top pairs including Indian pair of Mahesh Bhupathi and Rohan Bopanna 6–4, 6-7(1), 12–10, Max Mirnyi and Daniel Nestor 7-6(3), 4–6, 12-10 losing only to Robert Lindstedt and Horia Tecau in the Group Stage.

Nielsen finished the year as top Danish player in doubles, a year-end best No. 21 individually and No. 9 in ATP Doubles Team Rankings with Marray. He also earned a career-high $334,901 in 2012 courtesy of his win at Wimbledon.

2013: Doubles career high ranking

At the start of 2013, Nielsen partnered Johan Brunstrom for the first time since September 2012 at Metz, they reached the final of 2013 Heineken Open at Auckland losing out to Colin Fleming and Bruno Soares in two tough sets 6-7(1), 6-7(2). Dropped to 1-2 overall in tour-level finals. They lost in the first round of 2013 Australian Open to Simone Bolelli and Fabio Fognini 3–6, 4–6.

The Dane then partnered Bulgarian Grigor Dimitrov for World Tour Masters 1000 Miami and Indian Wells reaching second round of the former and Semi-Finals his first at Masters event losing out to Mariusz Fyrstenberg and Marcin Matkowski 4–6, 2–6. Played with André Sá in 2013 Power Horse Cup at Düsseldorf and fell in the Semis to Andre Begemann and Martin Emmrich. Along with Matkowski, reached Semis of 2013 Aegon International losing to Colin Fleming and Jonathan Marray 11–9 in Match Tie-Break. Played with Eric Butorac at the 2013 Winston-Salem Open, reached Semi-Finals where they lost out to Daniel Nestor-and Leander Paes 3–6, 2–6.

2014: ATP 250 doubles title

Nielsen partnered Johan Brunstrom and they entered the 2014 Aircel Chennai Open in January, the pair did not lose a single set on their route to the finals and went on to win the title defeating Marin Draganja and Mate Pavic 6–2, 4–6, 10–7. This was Nielsen's first title other than Wimbledon.

In January at Copenhagen during  the Davis Cup Europe/Africa Zone Group II First Round Cyprus tie, he won both his singles and doubles matches partnering Thomas Kromann.

He then partnered Igor Sijsling for the 2014 Heineken Open and reached the quarters to only go down to the top seeds Alexander Peya and Bruno Soares 5–7, 5–7. He played at the Australian Open alongside Brunstrom and reached the second round before going down to Julien Benneteau and Edouard Roger-Vasselin in a tight three-setter 6–0, 5–7, 3–6.

Next he played at the Davis Cup Europe/Africa Zone Group II Luxembourg tie in April, winning both his singles and the doubles alongside Thomas Kromann, leading Denmark to a 5–0 victory, and to the Final Round in the Europe/Africa Zone Group II.

Partnering Brunstrom, he reached the semis at the 2014 Düsseldorf Open losing out to Martin Emmrich and Christopher Kas 0–6, 5–7. At the 2014 French Open the pair lost in the first round to Spaniards Marcel Granollers and Marc Lopez 5–7, 2–6. They next participated in the Wimbledon Championships falling in the second round.

In September, he played the Davis Cup Europe/Africa Zone Group II Denmark vs. Moldova tie, winning the first singles rubber and the doubles match but losing the reverse singles, thereby helping promote Denmark to the 2015 Davis Cup Europe/Africa Zone Group I.

He also won 3 ITF $15000 doubles titles at Switzerland, Dublin, Great Britain in March, July and October respectively with different and 1 ATP Challenger doubles title at Charlottesville Men's Pro Challenger in 2014.

Performance timelines

Singles

Doubles
Current through the 2022 Davis Cup.

Significant finals

Grand Slam finals

Doubles: 1 (1 title)

ATP career finals

Doubles: 6 (3 titles, 3 runner-ups)

ATP Challenger and ITF Futures finals

Singles: 32 (14–18)

Doubles: 88 (60–28)

See also
List of Denmark Davis Cup team representatives

References

External links

 
 
 

1983 births
Living people
Danish male tennis players
People from Kongens Lyngby
Wimbledon champions
Grand Slam (tennis) champions in men's doubles
Sportspeople from the Capital Region of Denmark